This is a list of comedy films released in the 1940s.

American films

1940
The Bank Dick
The Ghost Breakers
The Great Dictator
The Great McGinty
His Girl Friday
My Favorite Wife
My Little Chickadee
One Night in the Tropics

1941
Andy Hardy's Private Secretary
Ball of Fire
The Big Store
The Bride Came C.O.D.
Buck Privates
The Devil and Miss Jones
The Flame of New Orleans
Great Guns
Here Comes Mr. Jordan
The Lady Eve
Mr. & Mrs. Smith
Never Give a Sucker an Even Break
Nine Lives Are Not Enough
That Night in Rio
Topper Returns

1942
The Man Who Came to Dinner
The Major and the Minor
My Sister Eileen
The Palm Beach Story
Rio Rita
Road to Morocco
Ship Ahoy
Tales of Manhattan
The Talk of the Town
There's One Born Every Minute
To Be or Not to Be
Woman of the Year
You Were Never Lovelier

1943
Crazy House
Du Barry Was a Lady
Government Girl
Heaven Can Wait
Hello Frisco, Hello
Hit the Ice
I Dood It
Jitterbugs
A Lady Takes a Chance
Mr. Lucky
The More the Merrier
A Night to Remember
Slightly Dangerous
They Got Me Covered
Thousands Cheer
Two Weeks to Live
Whistling in Brooklyn

1944
Arsenic and Old Lace
Hail the Conquering Hero
Lady in the Dark
The Miracle of Morgan's Creek
See Here, Private Hargrove
Sensations of 1945
Standing Room Only
The Princess and the Pirate

1945
Along Came Jones
The Bullfighters
Eadie Was a Lady
The Horn Blows at Midnight
Lady on a Train

1946
Angel on My Shoulder
The Great Morgan
Little Giant
Lover Come Back
Monsieur Beaucaire
A Night in Casablanca
The Time of Their Lives
Vacation in Reno
Without Reservations

1947
The Bachelor and the Bobby-Soxer (aka Bachelor Knight)
Buck Privates Come Home
Christmas Eve
The Egg and I
The Farmer's Daughter
Miracle on 34th Street
Monsieur Verdoux
Road to Rio
The Sin of Harold Diddlebock
Suddenly, It's Spring
The Voice of the Turtle
Where There's Life

1948
Abbott and Costello Meet Frankenstein
The Emperor Waltz
A Foreign Affair
June Bride
Mr. Blandings Builds His Dream House
The Noose Hangs High
One Touch of Venus
The Paleface
Sitting Pretty
Variety Time

1949
Adam's Rib
Africa Screams
Holiday Affair
John Loves Mary
I Was a Male War Bride
It's a Great Feeling
My Friend Irma

British films

Back-Room Boy (1942)
The Black Sheep of Whitehall (1941)
Blithe Spirit (1945)
Caesar and Cleopatra (1945)
Crook's Tour (1941)
The Frozen Limits (1940)
Gasbags (1940)
The Ghost of St Michaels (1941)
The Goose Steps Out (1942)
He Snoops to Conquer (1944)
Hoots Mon! (1940)
Hue and Cry (1946)
I Didn't Do It (1945)
It's Not Cricket (1948)
It's That Man Again (1943)
Kind Hearts and Coronets (1949)
Let George Do It! (1941)
Major Barbara (1941)
My Learned Friend (1943)
On Approval (1943)
Passport to Pimlico (1949)
Somewhere in England (1940) (and subsequent series)
Whisky Galore! (1948)

Comedy horror
1940
The Ghost Breakers
1941
The Smiling Ghost
1944
Zombies on Broadway
1948
Abbott and Costello Meet Frankenstein
1949
Abbott and Costello Meet the Killer, Boris Karloff

Comedy drama

Seven Gibbers (1940)
That Gang of Mine (1940)
Tugboat Annie Sails Again (1940)
The Amazing Mrs. Holliday (1943)
Salute to the Marines (1943)
Three Wise Fools (1946)
To Live in Peace (1947)

1940s

Comedy